State Road 390 (NM 390) is a  state highway in the US state of New Mexico. NM 390's southern terminus is at NM 187 in Salem, and the northern terminus is at NM 187 in Garfield.

Major intersections

See also

References

390
Transportation in Doña Ana County, New Mexico